AnyDecentMusic? is a website that collates album reviews from magazines, websites, and newspapers. Primarily focused on popular music – covering rock, pop, electronic, dance, folk, country, roots, hip-hop, R&B, and rap – albums are adjudged by aggregating a consensus from several sources; reviews are sourced from more than 50 websites, magazines and newspapers. These publications are largely based in the US and UK, but some are also from Canada, Ireland and Australia.

History
AnyDecentMusic? was set up in 2008 by Ally Palmer and Terry Watson, the directors of PalmerWatson, a newspaper and magazine design consultancy. On creating the site: "Newspapers are our business (and we're passionate about them). Our other passion is music, and we've combined the two things."

Site organization
The site's creators, Palmer and Watson, say: "[AnyDecentMusic?] surveys reviews of recent album releases in newspapers and websites and provides a constantly updated chart of critical reaction."

Ratings are averaged and albums ranked in a chart intended to give an overall picture of critical appraisal of current releases, based on the averaged score out of 10. This chart forms the centrepiece of the site. Users can also view charts showing rankings over 3 months, 6 months or 12 months. It is also possible to view a genre-specific chart, or to exclude genres not of interest.

Short extracts of the review are provided, with hyperlinks to the original article. Some print-only reviews are also included, but not all of these have extracts from the original. AnyDecentMusic? assesses reviews which do not provide a numerical score and assigns what it deems to be an appropriate score, based on the tone and content of the review. On album review pages, there generally is a link to streaming media service such as Spotify.

In July 2012, an AnyDecentMusic app was launched within the music streaming service Spotify.  This was Spotify's App of the Day on July 19. It was described by Spotify: "Developed from the AnyDecentMusic.com chart, which provides music lovers with constantly updated listings of the most acclaimed albums, this novel Spotify app uses ratings from the leading expert, independent review sources across the world to help you discover the best in new music". According to Palmer and Watson, "the focus on the ADM Spotify app is on all contemporary genres, from indie to electronic to hip hop and everything in between." They went on to explain the website's process of aggregating reviews:

Similar sites
The site is similar to other review aggregator websites such as Metacritic and Rotten Tomatoes in that it gathers reviews to assess critical acclaim. The site differs in the sense that it specializes in contemporary music in its chosen fields. It does not cover jazz or classical releases, or many world music albums, and tends to ignore most reissues, compilations and various artist collections. 

The site also offers regular track recommendations, called "Today We Love", and regular playlists, with themes that appear sometimes to be topical and sometimes random. Although similar in principle to other review aggregator websites, AnyDecentMusic? puts some focus on its users finding new music through its features, with users able to formulate a personal "chart" through genre and time period search filters.

Palmer and Watson described their reasoning behind the site on their PalmerWatson.com website:
"We couldn't find a site that did what AnyDecentMusic? does, so we built one."

Chart
Once an album or release has five reviews from different sources, it enters the current Recent Releases chart, where it remains for six weeks. It is this chart that forms the centerpiece of the site. In 2010 The Observer Sunday newspaper regularly featured the AnyDecentMusic? top 10 in its charts page.

There is an "All-Time" Chart, but this covers only the duration of the website's existence, which was launched in 2009.

Since the site's beginning, the following albums have the highest aggregate rating:

 To Pimp a Butterfly by Kendrick Lamar – 9.3
 Fetch the Bolt Cutters by Fiona Apple – 9.2
 Damn by Kendrick Lamar – 9.1
 Black Messiah by D'Angelo – 9.1
 Ghosteen by Nick Cave and the Bad Seeds - 9.0
 Prioritise Pleasure by Self Esteem - 9.0
 Rough and Rowdy Ways by Bob Dylan – 8.9
 Skeleton Tree by Nick Cave and the Bad Seeds – 8.9
 Channel Orange by Frank Ocean – 8.9
 We're All Alone in This Together by Dave – 8.9
 Hadestown by Anaïs Mitchell – 8.8
 RTJ4 by Run the Jewels – 8.8
 My Beautiful Dark Twisted Fantasy by Kanye West – 8.8
 You Want It Darker by Leonard Cohen – 8.8
 Promises by Floating Points, Pharoah Sanders, The London Symphony Orchestra – 8.8
 Sometimes I Might Be Introvert by Little Simz - 8.8
 Carrie & Lowell by Sufjan Stevens – 8.8
 Set My Heart on Fire Immediately by Perfume Genius – 8.8
 A Crow Looked at Me by Mount Eerie – 8.8
 The Guitar Song by Jamey Johnson – 8.8

Lowest rating:
 JLS by JLS – 2.7

Highest Rated Album Per Year of Chart Existence:

 2009: Merriweather Post Pavilion by Animal Collective – 8.4
 2010: Hadestown by Anais Mitchell – 8.8
 2011: Let England Shake by PJ Harvey – 8.7
 2012: Channel Orange by Frank Ocean – 8.9
 2013: Sunbather (album) by Deafheaven – 8.8
 2014: Black Messiah by D'Angelo and the Vanguard – 9.1
 2015: To Pimp A Butterfly by Kendrick Lamar – 9.3
 2016: Skeleton Tree by Nick Cave and the Bad Seeds – 8.9
 2017: DAMN. by Kendrick Lamar  – 9.1
 2018: Room 25 by Noname – 8.5
 2019: Ghosteen by Nick Cave and the Bad Seeds – 9.0
 2020: Fetch the Bolt Cutters by Fiona Apple – 9.2
 2021: Prioritise Pleasure by Self Esteem - 9.0

See also
Review aggregator
Metacritic
Rotten Tomatoes

References

External links
 AnyDecentMusic? homepage

Music review websites
Internet properties established in 2009
British music websites
British review websites